The Electoral district of Warrnambool was an electoral district of the Victorian Legislative Assembly.

Between 1955 and 1967 the district was abolished and distributed between the Electoral district of Portland, Electoral district of Hampden and the Electoral district of Polwarth.

The city of Warrnambool was absorbed by the Electoral district of Portland

Members for Warrnambool

Election results

See also
 Parliaments of the Australian states and territories
 List of members of the Victorian Legislative Assembly

References

Former electoral districts of Victoria (Australia)
1856 establishments in Australia
1955 disestablishments in Australia
1967 establishments in Australia
2002 disestablishments in Australia